Eshkashem Airport  is a public use airport located near Ishkashim, Badakhshan, Afghanistan.

See also
List of airports in Afghanistan

References

External links 
 Airport record for Eshkashem Airport at Landings.com.

Airports in Afghanistan
Buildings and structures in Badakhshan Province